The Chekov Monument, designed by G.A. Zakharov, sculpted by Iulian Rukavishnikov. Located in the Chekhov Square in Taganrog. It was unveiled on January 29, 1960, to coincide with the writer Anton Chekhov's centennial birth anniversary.

History of the Monument

The idea to erect a monument to Chekhov first came from the authorities in 1910. In 1944 the Council of People's Commissars decreed to erect a monument to Chekhov to commemorate the 40th anniversary of the writer's death. 

By October 1954, 18 projects of the statue were submitted, and all of them were exposed to the public in the Local Lore Museum of Taganrog. Three years later the Second Nationwide Contest was held in Moscow, where 30 projects of the statue were submitted. After the second round the best works were sent to Taganrog where the statue by Iulian Rukavishnikov earned universal approval. 

The monument comprises a granite pedestal and a bronze statue showing Chekhov impeccably dressed, sitting on the stone, looking into the distance and holding a book in his right hand, his forefinger between pages as though the writer is reflecting on something deep. The height of the monument is 3 m (9.84 f.). 

The Chekhov Square was planted in the Red Square (in front of Alexandrovskiye Trade Rows) in Taganrog in 1934 to mark the writers 75th anniversary in 1935. 

The Chekhov Monument acts as a tribute paid by the people of Taganrog to their most renowned fellow townsman.

On January 29, 2010 Russian President Dmitri Medvedev laid flowers to the monument within the framework of commemorative events of the 150th birth anniversary of Anton Chekhov in Taganrog.

Photos

References 
 The Taganrog Encyclopaedia, 2nd edition, 2003
 materials of the Taganrog State Archive and Taganrog Local Government

Monuments and memorials built in the Soviet Union
Outdoor sculptures in Russia
1960 sculptures
Monuments and memorials in Taganrog
Anton Chekhov
Cultural heritage monuments in Taganrog
Cultural heritage monuments of federal significance in Rostov Oblast